Cranswick plc is a leading UK food producer and supplier of premium, fresh and added-value food products. The company is listed on the London Stock Exchange and is a constituent of the FTSE 250 Index.

History
Cranswick was founded by Jim Bloom, Mike Field and twenty-one other East Riding of Yorkshire farmers producing pig feed in 1974 under the name Cranswick Mill. The company subsequently diversified into food production. It was first listed on the London Stock Exchange in 1985. In 1993 Cranswick diversified into pet products with the purchase of George Buckton and then, in 2009, sold its pet products business. The company has recently moved back to breeding and rearing its own British pigs after acquiring East Anglian Pigs Limited and livestock and assets from Dent Ltd in 2013.

Cranswick has developed through a combination of acquisitions and subsequent organic growth, enabling the company to build upon its philosophy of working with artisan producers to provide premium, market leading products to a much wider audience. The Company now serves its customers from twelve production facilities across the UK.

On 25 July 2016, the company announced it had sold The Sandwich Factory Holdings Ltd for £15 million to Greencore.

Acquisitions
 2001: Continental Fine Foods
 2003: Cranswick plc acquires The Sandwich Factory
 2005: Perkins Chilled Foods
 2006: Delico, a cooked meats producer
 2009: Bowes of Norfolk
 2012: Kingston Foods, a cooked meats business
 2013: East Anglian Pigs Ltd and Dent Ltd, pig rearing businesses
2014: Benson Park, a premium cooked poultry business
2016: CCL Holdings Limited and Crown Chicken Limited, a leading integrated poultry producer
2016: Dunbia Ballymena, a leading Northern Irish pork processing business

Operations
Cranswick produces fresh pork, gourmet sausages, cooked meat, air-dried bacon, premium cooked poultry, charcuterie, sandwiches and gourmet pastry products. The Company’s brands include Bodega, Weight Watchers, Woodall’s, Simply Sausages, Red Lion Foods and the Black Farmer. Cranswick’s core market is the UK but the company has a rapidly developing export business serving the European, US and South East Asian markets.

References

External links
Official site

Companies based in Kingston upon Hull
Food and drink companies established in 1974
Food manufacturers of the United Kingdom
Companies listed on the London Stock Exchange
1974 establishments in England